Harpalus janinae is a species of ground beetle in the subfamily Harpalinae. It was described by Jeanne in 1984.

References

janinae
Beetles described in 1984